Cleopatra exarata is a species of freshwater snails with an operculum, aquatic gastropod molluscs in the family Paludomidae.

This species is endemic to Kenya. Its natural habitats are rivers and intermittent rivers. It is threatened by habitat loss.

References

Paludomidae
Gastropods described in 1878
Endemic molluscs of Kenya
Freshwater snails of Africa
Taxonomy articles created by Polbot